Paolo Nocella is a former Australian politician. He was a Labor member of the South Australian Legislative Council from 10 October 1995, when he was appointed to a casual vacancy created by Mario Feleppa's resignation, to 1997, when he was defeated in the general election.

References

Year of birth missing (living people)
Living people
Members of the South Australian Legislative Council
Place of birth missing (living people)
Australian Labor Party members of the Parliament of South Australia